Wallby estate is situated on the outskirts of the village of Skirö in Vetlanda Municipality in Småland, Sweden. The main building was built around 1840.

Buildings and structures in Jönköping County